Gliny Wielkie  is a village in the administrative district of Gmina Borowa, within Mielec County, Subcarpathian Voivodeship, in south-eastern Poland.

References

Gliny Wielkie